Elaine D. Harvey (born September 18, 1954, in Lovell, Wyoming) is an American politician and a Republican member of the Wyoming House of Representatives representing District 26 since January 2003.

Education
Harvey graduated from Lovell High School and earned her AS from the Northwest College.

Elections
2012 Harvey won the August 21, 2012 Republican Primary with 1,242 votes (62.7%), and was unopposed for the November 6, 2012 General election, winning with 3,446 votes.
2002 Harvey challenged incumbent Republican Representative Charles Hessenthaler for the District 26 seat in the August 20, 2002 Republican Primary and won with 1,419 votes (59.7%), and won the November 5, 2002 General election with 2,484 votes (85.6%) against Libertarian candidate Paul Garrison.
2004 Harvey was unopposed for both the August 17, 2004 Republican Primary, winning with 1,585 votes, and the November 2, 2004 General election, winning with 3,400 votes.
2006 Harvey was unopposed for both the August 22, 2006 Republican Primary, winning with 2,113 votes, and the November 7, 2006 General election, winning with 2,932 votes.
2008 Harvey was unopposed for both the August 19, 2008 Republican Primary, winning with 1,545 votes, and the November 4, 2008 General election, winning with 3,425 votes.
2010 Harvey was unopposed for both the August 17, 2010 Republican Primary, winning with 2,251 votes, and the November 2, 2010 General election, winning with 2,793 votes.

References

External links
Official page at the Wyoming Legislature
 

1954 births
Living people
Republican Party members of the Wyoming House of Representatives
People from Lovell, Wyoming
Women state legislators in Wyoming
21st-century American politicians
21st-century American women politicians